Wallace, Fujian Food Co., Ltd., doing business as Wallace, previously as CNHLS, is a fast food chain in China. Its head office is in Taijiang District, Fuzhou, Fujian.

Its English name was originally Wallace.

CNHLS's sales reached $407 million USD in 2010, an increase of 416% over its 2007 total. In 2012 the company had about 3,000 restaurants, and this number grew to about 4,000 in 2013. The restaurant was No. 2 in the China Daily list of the " Top 10 fast-food chains in China".

References

External links

  Wallace
  华莱士快餐官方网站 (CNHLS Restaurant Network)
  Wallace on Sina Weibo
  "福建省华莱士食品有限公司" (Archive). Fujian Agriculture and Forestry University Food Product Science College.

Fast-food chains of China
Companies based in Fuzhou
Fuzhou